The flag of Seychelles was adopted on 8 January 1996. The current flag is the third used by the country since its independence from the United Kingdom on 29 June 1976. The colours used in the current flag are the official colours of two of the country's major political parties: the Seychelles People's United Party and the Seychelles Democratic Party.

Description 

This unique flag consists of five different coloured bands (blue, yellow, red, white, and green) starting from one end and diverging towards the other end. The oblique bands symbolize a dynamic new country moving into the future. The colour blue depicts the sky and the sea that surrounds the Seychelles. Yellow is for the sun which gives light and life, red symbolizes the people and their determination to work for the future in unity and love, while the white band represents social justice and harmony. The green depicts the land and natural environment.

Construction Sheet

History 

The original flag was adopted after independence on June 29, 1976. It had alternating blue and red triangles. The flag was very similar to the Australasian United Steam Navigation Company's flag, whose ships regularly visited the islands of Seychelles in the early 20th century. 

In 1977, when president James Mancham was overthrown by France-Albert René, the old flag was abolished and the red, white and green flag based on the flag of the Seychelles People's United Party came into use, which had a distinct wavy white stripe. The only significant difference between the national flag and SPUP's flag was the depiction of the sun in the party's flag which was not used in the country's flag. The flag looked like a combination of the flag of the Latvian SSR and the Lithuanian SSR. When the party lost the majority in the elections, other parties demanded a change in the flag which led to a parliamentary approval of a new proposed design.

1903–1976

1976–present

References

External links 

 
 A history of Seychelles flags

Flag
Flags of Africa
Rainbow flags
Flags introduced in 1976
Flags introduced in 1977
Flags introduced in 1996
Seychelles